Jack Gibbs can refer to:

 Jack Gibbs (basketball) (born 1995), an American basketball player
 Jack Gibbs (cricketer) (born 2000), an English cricketer
 Jack Gibbs (sociologist) (1927–2020), an American sociologist